Wolfisheim (Alsatian: Wolfze) is a commune in the Bas-Rhin department in Grand Est in north-eastern France. Its synagogue, built in 1897, is a listed monument.

Population

See also 
 Communes of the Bas-Rhin department

References 

Communes of Bas-Rhin
Bas-Rhin communes articles needing translation from French Wikipedia
Historic Jewish communities
Jewish French history